Altoqualine is an isoquinoline once studied for its potential use as an antihistamine and antiallergic, but it was never a marketed drug.  It is an inhibitor of histidine decarboxylase.

References

Benzylisoquinolines
Antihistamines
Histidine decarboxylase inhibitors